Girl King is a 2002 Canadian feature-length, drag king pirate movie; directed, produced, written and edited by Ileana Pietrobruno, with cinematography by John Houtman. It stars Chrystal Donbrath-Zinga, Michael-Ann Connor, Raven Courtney, Victoria Deschanel, Joyce Pate, and Jonathan Sutton. The music is by Amon Tobin.

Film festivals
Berlinale 2003
Los Angeles OutFest 2002
Frameline San Francisco 2002
London Lesbian and Gay Film Festival 2003
Tokyo International Lesbian & Gay Film Festival 2003
Out In Africa 2003
Ljubljana Gay And Lesbian Film Festival 2002
Miami Gay And Lesbian Film Festival 2003
North Carolina Gay & Lesbian Film Festival 2003

See also
 List of LGBT films directed by women

References

External links

Technodyke Review - A Camp Swashbuckler for our Time

2002 films
English-language Canadian films
Transgender-related films
Canadian LGBT-related films
Lesbian-related films
2002 LGBT-related films
2000s Canadian films